The 1974 Davis Cup was the 63rd edition of the Davis Cup, the most important tournament between national teams in men's tennis. 57 teams would enter the competition, 33 in the Europe Zone, 12 in the Americas Zone, and 12 in the Eastern Zone. Nigeria made its first appearance in the tournament.

South Africa defeated Colombia in the Americas Inter-Zonal final, India defeated Australia in the Eastern Zone final, and Italy and the Soviet Union were the winners of the two Europe Zones, defeating Romania and Czechoslovakia respectively.

In the Inter-Zonal Zone, South Africa defeated Italy and India defeated the Soviet Union in the semifinals.

India refused to travel to South Africa for the final due to their government's opposition to South Africa's apartheid policies: therefore, the final was scratched and South Africa were awarded the Davis Cup. South Africa became only the fifth nation to win the Davis Cup, breaking the dominance of the United States, Great Britain, France and Australia teams which had won every tournament before this year.

Americas Zone

North & Central America Zone

Preliminary rounds

Main Draw

South America Zone

Preliminary rounds

Main Draw

Americas Inter-Zonal Final
Colombia vs. South Africa

Eastern Zone

Preliminary rounds

Main Draw

Final
India vs. Australia

The Eastern Zone Final set the Davis Cup record for the most games in a tie (327).

Europe Zone

Zone A

Pre-qualifying rounds

Preliminary rounds

Main Draw

Final
Italy vs. Romania

Zone B

Pre-qualifying rounds

Preliminary rounds

Main Draw

Final
Soviet Union vs. Czechoslovakia

Inter-Zonal Zone

Draw

Semifinals
India vs. Soviet Union

South Africa vs. Italy

Final
The final between South Africa and India was scheduled to be completed by 1 December 1974, but India refused to travel to South Africa due to their government's opposition to South Africa's apartheid policies. Therefore, the final was scratched and South Africa were awarded the Davis Cup.

Notes

References

External links
Davis Cup Official Website

 
Davis Cups by year
Davis Cup
Davis Cup
Davis Cup
Davis Cup
Davis Cup
Davis Cup
Davis Cup